The Eshtemoa Synagogue, located 15 km south of Hebron in as-Samu, West Bank, refers to the remains of an ancient Jewish synagogue dating from around the 4th–5th century CE.

History

Eshtemoa, identified as modern as-Samu, was an ancient city named in the Bible. During Roman and Byzantine period, Eshtemoa was described as a large Jewish village.

The Jerusalem Talmud (Nedarim 6:10 - Leiden Ms.) recalls a man who lived there, named Ḥasa of Eshtemoa.

Description of synagogue
The remains of the synagogue were identified by L. A. Mayer and A. Reifenberg in 1934, in which site they describe a recess in the wall, once used as a Torah Ark ("Heikhal"). In 1969–70, a full excavation of the site under the guidance of Ze'ev Yeivin revealed that the building occupied the most prominent site in the village. Ancillary buildings attached to the synagogue were removed in order to reveal the old structure. Entry was by any of three doors along its eastern side and one of the three niches recessed into the northern wall functioned as the Torah Ark. The building housed a mosaic floor and displayed external ornamental carvings. Four seven-branched menorahs were discovered carved onto door lintels and one of them is displayed in Jerusalem's Rockefeller Museum. Along the northern and southern walls of the synagogue were built two benches, one on top of the other, of which only remnants remain. 

After the Muslim conquest, the synagogue was converted into a mosque and a mihrab was added. The mihrab was built in place of the bench that ran along its southern wall. According to a local tradition, this addition was made during the conquest of Salah a-Din, rather than during the early Muslim conquest of the Levant. 

Many architectural elements of the building have been reused in the modern village.

Near the eastern flank of the synagogue there was built a Crusader church in the 12th-century.

References

Eshtemoa
Archaeological sites in the West Bank
Eshtemoa
Mosques converted from synagogues
4th-century establishments in the Byzantine Empire
Biblical cities
Talmud places

he:א-סמוע